Melodinus axillaris is a species of plant in the family Apocynaceae. It is endemic to Yunnan Province in southern China.

References

Flora of Yunnan
axillaris
Vulnerable plants
Plants described in 1973
Taxonomy articles created by Polbot